Jazz W Wolnych Chwilach is a double album released by O.S.T.R. in 2003.

Track listing

Disc one
"Jazz Nocnym Rytmem" (Jazz is the Night's Rhythm)
"Początek..." (Beginning)
"Co Ty Tu Robisz?" (What Are You Doing Here?)
"Boże Igrzysko cz. 2" (God's Playground vol. 2)
"Bałuty..." [part of Łódź]
"Problemy" (Problems)
"Nie Lubię Poniedziałków" (I Don't Like Mondays)
"Luzzzzz" (Relaxxxxxx)
"Rap Po Godzinach" (Rap After Hours)
"Życie" (Life)
"W Oceanie Zmysłów" (In the Ocean of Senses)
"Wszystko Co Mam" (Everything I Have)
"Korzenie" (Roots)
"..."
"Program"
"Z-Łodzi-eje" (Thieves from Łódź)
"Znam To" (I Know That)
"Człowiek Z Przyszłości" (Man From The Future)
"Jak Być...?" (How To Be...?)
"Jazz W Wolnych Chwilach (Ziom odpocznij)" (Jazz in Free Time (Homie Relax))

Disc two
"Huana"
"30 Sekund" (30 Seconds)
"Wehikuł Czasu" (Time Machine)
"Dwie Strony Gry" (Two Sides of the Game)
"Gangsterskie Opowieści" (Gangster Stories)
"Słowo To Siła" (Word is Strength)
"Patent Na Luxus" (Patent For Luxury)
"Luzzzzz" (Relaxxxxxx)
"4 Elementy" (4 Elements)
"Hajabuza" (Hayabusa)
"Skazany Na Rap" (Convicted to Rap)
"Zamach Stanu" (Coup d'état)
"Sztuka Ulicy" (Art of the Street)
"Labirynt" (Labyrinth)
"Blok" (Block)
"Mówisz..." (You Say...)
"Autobiografia" (Autobiography)
"Nic Pod Publikę" (Nothing for the Public)
"Cisza Przed Burzą" (Silence Before the Storm)
"Kiedy Mnie Z Tego Zabierzesz" (When Will You Take Me From This)
"Samotność" (Solitude)
"Tabasko" (Tabasco)
"Pokoje" (bonus track) (Rooms)

2003 albums
O.S.T.R. albums
Polish-language albums